Verna Gaston (November 1950 – September 16, 2005) was a Filipino actress who was first scouted by José Roxas Perez, top man of the then Sampaguita Pictures who convinced her to be a movie star.

Born in November 1950,  she became one of the sexiest movie stars in the late-1960s.  She is also a recording artist cutting two singles under Villar Record's sublabel Action Records.  At the onset of the Bomba (Bold) movies era in Philippine cinema (early-1970s), she shied away from movies and opted to be a singer instead.  Her singing career spanned the Philippines, and on 1976 started to conquer Japan, The Middle East, Guam, Egypt and Greece as well.

Ms. Gaston succumbed to Thymoma Cancer at 54 on September 16, 2005 and was survived by her two children, Angel and Chiok. She never married.

Filmography
Dolphy's Angels - 1982
24 Sexy - 1971
Totoy Guwapo - 1971
Mekeni's Gold - 1970
Ang Pulubi - 1969
Mga Tigre sa looban - 1969
Magnum Barracuda - 1968
Doon Po sa Amin - 1968
Junior Cursillo - 1968
May Tampuhan, Paminsan-minsan - 1968
El Perro Gancho - 1968
Pitong Krus ng Isang Ina - 1968
Bikini Beach Party - 1967
Ang Pangarap Ko'y Ikaw - 1967
Bus Stop - 1967
Let's Dance the Soul - 1967
All Over the World - 1967
Jamboree '66 - 1966
Espada ng Rubitanya - 1965

Discography
I'm a Tiger - 1969
Where is Tomorrow - 1969
I Will (cover version) - 1969
Bang Bang - 1969

Filipino film actresses
1950 births
2005 deaths